The 1922 Northwestern Purple team represented Northwestern University during the 1922 Big Ten Conference football season. In their first year under head coach Glenn Thistlethwaite, the Purple compiled a 3–3–1 record (1–3–1 against Big Ten Conference opponents) and finished in seventh place in the Big Ten Conference.

Schedule

References

Northwestern
Northwestern Wildcats football seasons
Northwestern Purple football